Alois Riedler (May 15, 1850 - October 25, 1936) was a noted Austrian mechanical engineer, and, as professor in Germany, a vigorous proponent of practically-oriented engineering education.

Riedler was born in Graz, Austria, and studied mechanical engineering at the Technische Hochschule (TH) Graz from 1866-1871.  After graduation he took on a succession of academic appointments. He first became an assistant at the TH Brünn (1871-1873); then in 1873 moved to the TH Vienna, first as an assistant, then from 1875 onwards as a designer of machines. From 1880 to 1883, Riedler worked as associate professor at the TH Munich. In 1883 he became full professor at the TH Aachen.

In 1888 he joined the TH Berlin as Professor for Mechanical Engineering, where he remained until retirement in 1920. From 1899 to 1900, he was appointed the school's principal (rector) and led discussions on how to celebrate its 100th anniversary. As a result, Riedler and Adolf Slaby (1849–1913) convinced Kaiser Wilhelm II (1859–1941) to allow Prussian technical universities to award doctorates. Although the government did not immediately consent, this effort led eventually to the school's reconstitution as today's Technical University of Berlin.

Riedler first received international recognition for his reports on the Philadelphia Centennial Exposition (1876) and Paris Exposition Universelle (1878). He was later widely known for his efficient, high-speed pumps widely adopted in waterworks and in draining mines. Riedler was also known for his 1896 book "Das Maschinen-Zeichnen", (Machine Drawing) which introduced modern technical drawing.

Riedler was actively involved in the early development of internal combustion engines, both for gasoline and diesel fuel. In 1903 he established the Laboratory for Internal Combustion Engines at the TH Berlin, expanded in 1907 to include investigations of motor vehicles. As laboratory director, Riedler designed a pioneering roller test stand. He also received what was probably the first research contract to investigate fuels specifically for aircraft engines (particularly benzene).

In 1897 Riedler received the Grashof medal, the German Engineers' Association's highest honor. The Austrian Engineers' and Architects' Association appointed him honorary member in 1900 and awarded him their Gold Medal in 1931. In 1911 his alma mater TH Graz awarded him an honorary doctorate.

Notes

References 
 Kees Gispen, New Profession, Old Order: Engineers and German Society, 1815-1914, Cambridge University Press, 2002, pages 194-196. .
 Ernst-Heinrich Hirschel, Horst Prem, Gero Madelung, Aeronautical Research in Germany: From Lilienthal Until Today, Springer, 2004, page 253. .

See also 
 Leavitt-Riedler Pumping Engine

External links
 

1936 deaths
1850 births
Austrian mechanical engineers
Members of the Prussian House of Lords
Academic staff of the Technical University of Berlin
Academic staff of the Technical University of Munich